McDonough is an Irish surname.

Origins and variants
The surname is an Anglicized form of the Gaelic name  "Mac Donnchadha", which means son of Donnchadh or son of Donough. The name itself consists of elements meaning "brown (donn)" or Donn “the dark one”, plus "battle (chatha)".

Originally, two separate clans existed in Ireland, the first in Connacht, and these MacDonnchadha's were a branch of the MacDermots, the 8th Century Kings of Connacht.

The second clan in Munster, whose chiefs held the Castle of Kanturk in County Cork, and who were known as the bards of Duhallow, were a branch of the MacCarthys going by McDonough. The name is now rare in Cork, with some of the original name holders, it is believed, changing their name to MacCarthy, although some with the original name still remain in Munster.

One explanation for the many spelling variations is that scribes and church officials frequently spelled the name as it sounded: an imprecise method at best. Understandably then, various spellings of the surname McDonough were found in the many archives researched including MacDonough, McDonogh, and many more.

Notable people with the surname
 Adam McDonough (born 1985), American mixed martial artist
 Aidan McDonough (born 1999), American ice hockey player
 Al McDonough, Canadian ice hockey player  
 Alexa McDonough, Canadian politician
 Ann M. McDonough (1915-1995), member of the Military Intelligence Hall of Fame
 Ann Patrice McDonough, American figure skater
 Arthur Edward McDonogh, (c. 1810 – 1852), New Zealand policeman, police magistrate, militia officer and roading supervisor. 
 Brendan McDonough, American soccer player
 Blair McDonough, Australian actor
 Bob McDonogh, American racecar driver
 Brian McDonough, American physician and writer
 Bridget McDonough, American businesswoman
 David McDonough, New York Assemblyman
 Darron McDonough, English footballer
 Declan McDonogh, Irish jockey who competes in Flat racing 
 Denis McDonough,  US Secretary of Veterans Affairs under President Joe Biden; White House Chief of Staff,  Deputy National Security Advisor and National Security Council Chief of Staff under President Barack Obama.
 Eileen McDonough (1962–2012), American child actress
 Elizabeth MacDonough, Parliamentarian of the United States Senate
 Frank McDonough, British historian of 20th-century Germany 
 Fred McDonogh, Irish politician 
 Gabe McDonough, Canadian record producer who is the vice president music director at Leo Burnett USA
 George Macdonogh, British Army general officer.
 Giles MacDonogh (born 1955), British writer, historian and translator
 Glen MacDonough (1870–1924), US American writer, lyricist and librettist
 Gordon L. McDonough, U.S. Representative from California
 Guy McDonough, Australian rock musician
 Harry Macdonough, Canadian singer and recording executive
 Hubie McDonough, American ice hockey player
 Jack McDonough, Australian rules footballer who played with South Melbourne and Fitzroy in the VFL during the early 1900s
 Jake McDonough, American football defensive end
 James MacDonough (born 1970), American bass guitarist
 James McDonogh, Irish first-class cricketer
 Jenny McDonough, field hockey forward who plays for Ireland
 Jimmy McDonough, American journalist and biographer
 John McDonogh (1779-1850), United States entrepreneur and philanthropist, founder and namesake of McDonoghville Louisiana
 John McDonogh (hurler) (1941–2012), Irish hurler who played as full-back for the Limerick senior team
 John McDonough (piper), Irish piper from County Galway
 John McDonough (Savannah mayor), politician and businessman from Georgia, US
 John McDonough (sports executive) (born 1953), former president of the Chicago Blackhawks ice hockey team
 John E. McDonough (born 1953), professor of public health at the Harvard School of Public Health
 John J. McDonough (Massachusetts politician), American politician who served as a member of the Boston School Committee from 1966 to 1968 and again from 1972 to 1982
 John J. McDonough (mayor), mayor of St. Paul, Minnesota
 John P. McDonough (politician), American politician from Maryland
 John T. McDonough, Irish born-American lawyer and politician
 Kiki McDonough, British jewellery designer
 Martin McDonogh (1860–1934), Irish politician
 Marie McDonough (1917–2013), Australian cricketer
 Mary Elizabeth McDonough, American actress
 Mary ("Polly") McDonough (1783–1856), mother of Andrew Johnson, the 17th President of the United States
 Matthew McDonough, drummer for American heavy metal band Mudvayne
 Megon McDonough, American folk/cabaret singer/songwriter
 Neal McDonough, American actor
 Pat McDonough, US Maryland politician
 Patrick MacDonogh, 20th-century Irish poet
 Patrick McDonough (cyclist) (born 1961), American track cyclist
 Patrick F. McDonough (fl. 1956–2001), Irish-American police officer, attorney, and politician 
 Paul McDonough (disambiguation), several people
 Pete McDonough, San Francisco bail bondsman
 Peter J. McDonough (1925–1998), American Republican Party politician from New Jersey
 R. C. McDonough (1924–2018), Justice of the Montana Supreme Court
 Roger I. McDonough, American judge, served on the Utah Supreme Court from 1938 to 1966
 Roy McDonough, English football player and manager who holds the record for red cards in the English professional game
 Ryan McDonough (disambiguation), several people
 Sean McDonough, American television sportscaster
 Sean Daniel (basketball) (born 1989), Israeli basketball player 
 Suzanne Clarke McDonough, American journalist, documentary filmmaker
 Thomas Macdonough, 19th-century American naval officer
 Will McDonough, American sportswriter for the Boston Globe
 William McDonough, American architect and author
 William Joseph McDonough, Federal Reserve Bank of New York chairman

Given name
Macdonough Craven, (1858–1919), American naval officer, engineer, and politician
Tunis Augustus Macdonough Craven (1813–1864), officer in the United States Navy

Fictional characters
 Alex McDonough, lawyer in the film I Now Pronounce You Chuck & Larry, portrayed by Jessica Biel.
 Blane McDonough, a rich boy in the film Pretty in Pink, portrayed by Andrew McCarthy.
 Declan McDonough, spoiled rich kid and high school basketball star in the American science fiction television series Kyle XY, portrayed by Chris Olivero.
 H.I. "Hi" McDunnough, portrayed by Nicolas Cage in the film Raising Arizona.
 Jefferson "Seaplane" McDonough, pilot in the film Jumanji: Welcome to the Jungle and its sequel, portrayed by Nick Jonas.
 Detective Sergeant McDonough, police detective in the film Criminally Insane portrayed by George Buck Flower.
 Detective McDonough, police detective in the film Devil's Knot, portrayed by Brian Howe.

References

Surnames of Irish origin